James Pinckney Pope (March 31, 1884January 23, 1966) was a Democratic politician from Idaho. He was mayor of Boise for four years and a one-term United States Senator, serving from 1933 to 1939.

Early life and career
Born in Jonesboro, Louisiana, Pope graduated from Louisiana Industrial Institute (now Louisiana Tech University) in Ruston in 1906 and from the University of Chicago Law School in 1909 where he became a member of the Delta Chi fraternity. He was admitted to the bar then moved west to Idaho to practice law in Boise, and served as city attorney, assistant attorney general of Idaho, and a member of the board of education of Boise. Pope was mayor of Boise from 1929 to 1933.

United States Senate
He was elected as a Democrat to the United States Senate in 1932, defeating Republican incumbent John W. Thomas of Gooding. From 1934-36, Pope was a member of the Nye Committee. In 1938, he was defeated for renomination in the Democratic primary by Congressman D. Worth Clark of Pocatello, who went on to win the general election.

Pope was a stalwart of the Roosevelt administration and the New Deal, and it was suggested that Idaho's senior senator  William Borah, the dean of the U.S. Senate, felt upstaged at times and had a hand in Pope's loss to the more conservative Clark in the August primary.

After Congress
In 1939, Pope was appointed a director of the Tennessee Valley Authority by President Roosevelt and served in that capacity until 1951. He continued to practice law and serve on several boards in Tennessee after that.

Pope relocated to Alexandria, Virginia, in 1963 and died there at age 81 in 1966. He and his wife, Pauline Ruth Horn Pope (1887–1957), are buried in Lynnhurst Cemetery in Knoxville, Tennessee. They had two sons, Ross P. Pope and George A. Pope.

References

External links

The Political Graveyard

1884 births
1966 deaths
Mayors of Boise, Idaho
People from Knoxville, Tennessee
Politicians from Alexandria, Virginia
Louisiana Tech University alumni
Democratic Party United States senators from Idaho
Idaho Democrats
20th-century American politicians